Heratemita is a genus of the spider family Salticidae (jumping spiders).

Description
The black carapace is wider than long, very rugose and covered with sparse violet squamose hairs. There are four large white patches near the posterior eyes. The abdomen is elongate and also sparsely covered with violet hairs, with three white longitudinal stripes. The legs are slender and black with yellow-gold marks, except for the very robust frontal pair, which are black with yellow tarsi and metatarsi. The large male chelicerae run parallel and then suddenly diverge at right angles.

Species
As of May 2017, the World Spider Catalog lists the following species in the genus:
 Heratemita alboplagiata (Simon, 1899) – Philippines
 Heratemita chrysozona (Simon, 1899) – Sumatra
 Heratemita tenenbaumi Prószyński & Deeleman-Reinhold, 2012 – Sumatra

References

External links
 Photograph of Heratemita sp.

Arthropods of the Philippines
Salticidae genera
Taxa named by Embrik Strand
Spiders of Asia
Salticidae